Ilias Chouzouris (born 26 February 1975) is a Greek football defender currently playing for Filoti.

References

1975 births
Living people
People from Naxos
Greek footballers
Proodeftiki F.C. players
Ethnikos Asteras F.C. players
AEP Paphos FC players
A.O. Kerkyra players
Ilioupoli F.C. players
Aias Salamina F.C. players
Vyzas F.C. players
Super League Greece players
Cypriot First Division players
Association football defenders
Greek expatriate footballers
Expatriate footballers in Cyprus
Greek expatriate sportspeople in Cyprus
Sportspeople from the South Aegean